Crenicichla acutirostris is a species of cichlid from the Amazon River basin, in the Tapajós and Aripuanã River basins.

References

acutirostris
Fish of South America
Fish described in 1862
Taxa named by Albert Günther